Steven McLuckie (born 12 February 1973) is a former Australian rules footballer who played with the Brisbane Bears in the Australian Football League (AFL).

From Surfers Paradise, McLuckie played with AFL Queensland State League club Southport until his recruitment by Brisbane  as a zone selection at the 1990 AFL Draft.

McLuckie was Brisbane's leading goal-kicker and disposal getter with four goals and 25 disposals in his debut in 1993 against Collingwood at Victoria Park.  He ended up averaging 19 disposals from 13 appearances that year and was also a wingman in the Brisbane reserves premiership team.

McLuckie made the combined Queensland-Northern Territory State of Origin squad in 1993 but only played seven games for Brisbane and was delisted at the end of the season. He returned to Southport, for which he won a Joe Grant Medal in 2000, as the best player in the AFL Queensland State League grand final.

In 2015 McLuckie was appointed Executive Principal of the Gold Coast-based Varsity College. Prior to this, McLuckie held the position of Principal at Southport State High School for a number of years.

References

1973 births
Sportspeople from the Gold Coast, Queensland
Australian rules footballers from Queensland
Brisbane Bears players
Southport Australian Football Club players
Living people